Kumpolje is a small settlement south of Gabrovka in the Municipality of Litija in central Slovenia. The area is part of the traditional region of Lower Carniola. It is now included with the rest of the municipality in the Central Sava Statistical Region.

History
Kumpolje was a hamlet of Gornje Ravne until 1995, when it was made a separate settlement.

References

External links
Kumpolje on Geopedia

Populated places in the Municipality of Litija